Low-density lipoprotein (LDL) is one of the five major groups of lipoprotein that transport all fat molecules around the body in extracellular water. These groups, from least dense to most dense, are chylomicrons (aka ULDL by the overall density naming convention), very low-density lipoprotein (VLDL), intermediate-density lipoprotein (IDL), low-density lipoprotein (LDL) and high-density lipoprotein (HDL). LDL delivers fat molecules to cells. LDL is involved in atherosclerosis, a process in which it is oxidized within the walls of arteries.

Overview
Lipoproteins transfer lipids (fats) around the body in the extracellular fluid, making fats available to body cells for receptor-mediated endocytosis. Lipoproteins are complex particles composed of multiple proteins, typically 80–100 proteins per particle (organized by a single apolipoprotein B for LDL and the larger particles). A single LDL particle is about 220–275 angstroms in diameter, typically transporting 3,000 to 6,000 fat molecules per particle, and varying in size according to the number and mix of fat molecules contained within. The lipids carried include all fat molecules with cholesterol, phospholipids, and triglycerides dominant; amounts of each vary considerably.

The common clinical interpretation of blood lipid levels is that high LDL is associated with increased risk of cardiovascular diseases.

Biochemistry

Structure
Each native LDL particle enables emulsification, i.e. surrounding the fatty acids being carried, enabling these fats to move around the body within the water outside cells. Each particle contains a single apolipoprotein B-100 molecule (Apo B-100, a protein that has 4536 amino acid residues and a mass of 514 kDa), along with 80 to 100 additional ancillary proteins. Each LDL has a highly hydrophobic core consisting of polyunsaturated fatty acid known as linoleate and hundreds to thousands (about 1500 commonly cited as an average) of esterified and unesterified cholesterol molecules. This core also carries varying numbers of triglycerides and other fats and is surrounded by a shell of phospholipids and unesterified cholesterol, as well as the single copy of Apo B-100. LDL particles are approximately 22 nm (0.00000087 in.) to 27.5 nm in diameter and have a mass of about 3 million daltons. Since LDL particles contain a variable and changing number of fatty acid molecules, there is a distribution of LDL particle mass and size. Determining the structure of LDL has been a tough task because of its heterogeneous structure. The structure of LDL at human body temperature in native condition, with a resolution of about 16 Angstroms using cryogenic electron microscopy, has been recently described.

Physiology
LDL particles are formed when triglycerides are removed from VLDL by the lipoprotein lipase enzyme (LPL) and they become smaller and denser (i.e. fewer fat molecules with same protein transport shell), containing a higher proportion of cholesterol esters.

Transport into the cell
When a cell requires additional cholesterol (beyond its current internal HMGCoA production pathway), it synthesizes the necessary LDL receptors as well as PCSK9, a proprotein convertase that marks the LDL receptor for degradation. LDL receptors are inserted into the plasma membrane and diffuse freely until they associate with clathrin-coated pits. When LDL receptors bind LDL particles in the bloodstream, the clathrin-coated pits are endocytosed into the cell.

Vesicles containing LDL receptors bound to LDL are delivered to the endosome. In the presence of low pH, such as that found in the endosome, LDL receptors undergo a conformation change, releasing LDL. LDL is then shipped to the lysosome, where cholesterol esters in the LDL are hydrolysed. LDL receptors are typically returned to the plasma membrane, where they repeat this cycle. If LDL receptors bind to PCSK9, however, transport of LDL receptors is redirected to the lysosome, where they are degraded.

Role in the innate immune system
LDL interfere with the quorum sensing system that upregulates genes required for invasive Staphylococcus aureus infection. The mechanism of antagonism entails binding apolipoprotein B to a S. aureus autoinducer pheromone, preventing signaling through its receptor. Mice deficient in apolipoprotein B are more susceptible to invasive bacterial infection.

LDL size patterns
LDL can be grouped based on its size: large low density LDL particles are described as pattern A, and small high density LDL particles are pattern B. Pattern B has been associated by some with a higher risk for coronary heart disease. This is thought to be because the smaller particles are more easily able to penetrate the endothelium of arterial walls. Pattern I, for intermediate, indicates that most LDL particles are very close in size to the normal gaps in the endothelium (26 nm). According to one study, sizes 19.0–20.5 nm were designated as pattern B and LDL sizes 20.6–22 nm were designated as pattern A. Other studies have shown no such correlation at all.

Some evidence suggests the correlation between Pattern B and coronary heart disease is stronger than the correspondence between the LDL number measured in the standard lipid profile test. Tests to measure these LDL subtype patterns have been more expensive and not widely available, so the common lipid profile test is used more often.

There has also been noted a correspondence between higher triglyceride levels and higher levels of smaller, denser LDL particles and alternately lower triglyceride levels and higher levels of the larger, less dense ("buoyant") LDL.

With continued research, decreasing cost, greater availability and wider acceptance of other lipoprotein subclass analysis assay methods, including NMR spectroscopy, research studies have continued to show a stronger correlation between human clinically obvious cardiovascular events and quantitatively measured particle concentrations.

Oxidized LDL
Oxidized LDL is a general term for LDL particles with oxidatively modified structural components. As a result, from free radical attack, both lipid and protein parts of LDL can be oxidized in the vascular wall. Besides the oxidative reactions taking place in vascular wall, oxidized lipids in LDL can also be derived from oxidized dietary lipids.  Oxidized LDL is known to associate with the development of atherosclerosis, and it is therefore widely studied as a potential risk factor of cardiovascular diseases. Atherogenicity of oxidized LDL has been explained by lack of recognition of oxidation-modified LDL structures by the LDL receptors, preventing the normal metabolism of LDL particles and leading eventually to development of atherosclerotic plaques. Of the lipid material contained in LDL, various lipid oxidation products are known as the ultimate atherogenic species. Acting as a transporter of these injurious molecules is another mechanism by which LDL can increase the risk of atherosclerosis.

Testing
Blood tests commonly report LDL-C: the amount of cholesterol which is estimated to be contained with LDL particles, on average, using a formula, the Friedewald equation. In clinical context, mathematically calculated estimates of LDL-C are commonly used as an estimate of how much low density lipoproteins are driving progression of atherosclerosis. The problem with this approach is that LDL-C values are commonly discordant with both direct measurements of LDL particles and actual rates of atherosclerosis progression.

Direct LDL measurements are also available and better reveal individual issues but are less often promoted or done due to slightly higher costs and being available from only a couple of laboratories in the United States. In 2008, the ADA and ACC recognized direct LDL particle measurement by NMR as superior for assessing individual risk of cardiovascular events.

Estimation of LDL particles via cholesterol content
Chemical measures of lipid concentration have long been the most-used clinical measurement, not because they have the best correlation with individual outcome, but because these lab methods are less expensive and more widely available.

The lipid profile does not measure LDL particles. It only estimates them using the Friedewald equation
by subtracting the amount of cholesterol associated with other particles, such as HDL and VLDL, assuming a prolonged fasting state, etc.:

where H is HDL cholesterol, L is LDL cholesterol, C is total cholesterol, T are triglycerides, and k is 0.20 if the quantities are measured in mg/dL and 0.45 if in mmol/L.

There are limitations to this method, most notably that samples must be obtained after a 12 to 14 h fast and that LDL-C cannot be calculated if plasma triglyceride is >4.52 mmol/L (400 mg/dL). Even at triglyceride levels 2.5 to 4.5 mmol/L, this formula is considered inaccurate.  If both total cholesterol and triglyceride levels are elevated then a modified formula, with quantities in mg/dL, may be used

This formula provides an approximation with fair accuracy for most people, assuming the blood was drawn after fasting for about 14 hours or longer, but does not reveal the actual LDL particle concentration because the percentage of fat molecules within the LDL particles which are cholesterol varies, as much as 8:1 variation. There  are several formulas published addressing the inaccuracy in LDL-C estimation. The inaccuracy is based on the assumption that VLDL-C (Very low density lipoprotein cholesterol) is always one-fifth of the triglyceride concentration. A new formulae published recently addresses this issue by using an adjustable factor  or by using a regression equation. There are few studies which have compared the LDL-C values derived form this recently published formula and values obtained by direct enzymatic method. Direct enzymatic method are found to be accurate and it has to be the test of choice in clinical situations. In the resource poor settings, the option of using the formula has to be considered.

However, the concentration of LDL particles, and to a lesser extent their size, has a stronger and consistent correlation with individual clinical outcome than the amount of cholesterol within LDL particles, even if the LDL-C estimation is approximately correct. There is increasing evidence and recognition of the value of more targeted and accurate measurements of LDL particles. Specifically, LDL particle number (concentration), and to a lesser extent size, have shown slightly stronger correlations with atherosclerotic progression and cardiovascular events than obtained using chemical measures of the amount of cholesterol carried by the LDL particles. It is possible that the LDL cholesterol concentration can be low, yet LDL particle number high and cardiovascular events rates are high. Correspondingly, it is possible that LDL cholesterol concentration can be relatively high, yet LDL particle number low and cardiovascular events are also low.

Normal ranges
In the US, the American Heart Association, NIH, and NCEP provide a set of guidelines for fasting LDL-Cholesterol levels, estimated or measured, and risk for heart disease. As of about 2005, these guidelines were:

Over time, with more clinical research, these recommended levels keep being reduced because LDL reduction, including to abnormally low levels, was the most effective strategy for reducing cardiovascular death rates in one large double blind, randomized clinical trial of men with hypercholesterolemia; far more effective than coronary angioplasty/stenting or bypass surgery.

For instance, for people with known atherosclerosis diseases, the 2004 updated American Heart Association, NIH and NCEP recommendations are for LDL levels to be lowered to less than 70 mg/dL, unspecified how much lower. This low level of less than 70 mg/dL (higher than Tim Russert's value shortly prior to his heart attack) was recommended for primary prevention of 'very-high risk patients' and in secondary prevention as a 'reasonable further reduction'. Lack of evidence for such a recommendation is discussed in an article in the Annals of Internal Medicine. Statin drugs involved in such clinical trials have numerous physiological effects beyond simply the reduction of LDL levels.

It has been estimated from the results of multiple human pharmacologic LDL lowering trials that LDL should be lowered to below 30 to reduce cardiovascular event rates to near zero. For reference, from longitudinal population studies following progression of atherosclerosis-related behaviors from early childhood into adulthood, the usual LDL in childhood, before the development of fatty streaks, is about 35 mg/dL. However, all the above values refer to chemical measures of lipid/cholesterol concentration within LDL, not measured low-density lipoprotein concentrations, the accurate approach.

A study was conducted measuring the effects of guideline changes on LDL cholesterol reporting and control for diabetes visits in the US from 1995 to 2004. It was found that although LDL cholesterol reporting and control for diabetes and coronary heart disease visits improved continuously between 1995 and 2004, neither the 1998 ADA guidelines nor the 2001 ATP III guidelines increased LDL cholesterol control for diabetes relative to coronary heart disease.

Direct measurement of LDL particle concentrations
There are several competing methods for measurement of lipoprotein particle concentrations and size. The evidence is that the NMR methodology (developed, automated & greatly reduced in costs while improving accuracy as pioneered by Jim Otvos and associates) results in a 22-25% reduction in cardiovascular events within one year, contrary to the longstanding claims by many in the medical industry that the superiority over existing methods was weak, even by statements of some proponents.

Since the later 1990s, because of the development of NMR measurements, it has been possible to clinically measure lipoprotein particles at lower cost [under $80 US (including shipping) & is decreasing; versus the previous costs of >$400 to >$5,000] and higher accuracy. There are two other assays for LDL particles, however, like LDL-C, most only estimate LDL particle concentrations.

Direct LDL particle measurement by NMR was mentioned by the ADA and ACC, in a 28 March 2008 joint consensus statement, as having advantages for predicting individual risk of atherosclerosis disease events, but the statement noted that the test is less widely available, is more expensive [about $13.00 US (2015 without insurance coverage) from some labs which use the Vantera Analyzer]. Debate continues that it is "...unclear whether LDL particle size measurements add value to measurement of LDL-particle concentration", though outcomes have always tracked LDL particle, not LDL-C, concentrations.

Using NMR, the total LDL particle concentrations, in nmol/L plasma, are typically subdivided by percentiles referenced to the 5,382 men and women, not on any lipid medications, who are participating in the MESA trial.

Optimal ranges
The LDL particle concentrations are typically categorized by percentiles, <20%, 20–50%, 50th–80th%, 80th–95% and >95% groups of the people participating and being tracked in the MESA trial, a medical research study sponsored by the United States National Heart, Lung, and Blood Institute.

The lowest incidence of atherosclerotic events over time occurs within the <20% group, with increased rates for the higher groups. Multiple other measures, including particle sizes, small LDL particle concentrations, large total and HDL particle concentrations, along with estimations of insulin resistance pattern and standard cholesterol lipid measurements (for comparison of the plasma data with the estimation methods discussed above) are also routinely provided.

Lowering LDL-cholesterol

The mevalonate pathway serves as the basis for the biosynthesis of many molecules, including cholesterol. The enzyme 3-hydroxy-3-methylglutaryl coenzyme A reductase (HMG CoA reductase) is an essential component and performs the first of 37 steps within the cholesterol production pathway, and is present in every animal cell.

LDL-C is not a measurement of actual LDL particles. LDL-C is only an estimate (not measured from the individual's blood sample) of how much cholesterol is being transported by all LDL particles, which is either a smaller concentration of large particles or a high concentration of small particles. LDL particles carry many fat molecules (typically 3,000 to 6,000 fat molecules per LDL particle); this includes cholesterol, triglycerides, phospholipids and others. Thus even if the hundreds to thousands of cholesterol molecules within an average LDL particle were measured, this does not reflect the other fat molecules or even the number of LDL particles.

Pharmaceutical 
 PCSK9 inhibitors, in clinical trials, by several companies, are more effective for LDL reduction than the statins, including statins alone at high dose (though not necessarily the combination of statins plus ezetimibe).
 Statins reduce high levels of LDL particles by inhibiting the enzyme HMG-CoA reductase in cells, the rate-limiting step of cholesterol synthesis. To compensate for the decreased cholesterol availability, synthesis of LDL receptors (including hepatic) is increased, resulting in an increased clearance of LDL particles from the extracellular water, including of the blood.
 Ezetimibe reduces intestinal absorption of cholesterol, thus can reduce LDL particle concentrations when combined with statins.
 Niacin (B3), lowers LDL by selectively inhibiting hepatic diacylglycerol acyltransferase 2, reducing triglyceride synthesis and VLDL secretion through a receptor HM74 and HM74A or GPR109A.
 Several CETP inhibitors have been researched to improve HDL concentrations, but so far, despite dramatically increasing HDL-C, have not had a consistent track record in reducing atherosclerosis disease events. Some have increased mortality rates compared with placebo.
 Clofibrate is effective at lowering cholesterol levels, but has been associated with significantly increased cancer and stroke mortality, despite lowered cholesterol levels. Other, more recently developed and tested fibrates, e.g. fenofibric acid have had a better track record and are primarily promoted for lowering VLDL particles (triglycerides), not LDL particles, yet can help some in combination with other strategies.
 Some tocotrienols, especially delta- and gamma-tocotrienols, are being promoted as statin alternative non-prescription agents to treat high cholesterol, having been shown in vitro to have an effect. In particular, gamma-tocotrienol appears to be another HMG-CoA reductase inhibitor, and can reduce cholesterol production. As with statins, this decrease in intra-hepatic (liver) LDL levels may induce hepatic LDL receptor up-regulation, also decreasing plasma LDL levels. As always, a key issue is how benefits and complications of such agents compare with statins—molecular tools that have been analyzed in large numbers of human research and clinical trials since the mid-1970s.
 Phytosterols are widely recognized as having a proven LDL cholesterol lowering efficacy' A 2018 review found a dose-response relationship for phytosterols, with intakes of 1.5 to 3 g/day lowering LDL-C by 7.5% to 12%, but reviews as of 2017 had found  no data indicating that the consumption of phytosterols may reduce the risk of CVD. Current supplemental guidelines for reducing LDL recommend doses of phytosterols in the 1.6-3.0 grams per day range (Health Canada, EFSA, ATP III, FDA) with a 2009 meta-analysis demonstrating an 8.8% reduction in LDL-cholesterol at a mean dose of 2.15 gram per day.

Gene editing 
In 2021, scientists demonstrated that CRISPR gene editing can decrease blood levels of LDL cholesterol in vivo in Macaca fascicularis monkeys for months by 60% via knockout of PCSK9 in the liver.

Lifestyle 

The most effective lifestyle approach to reduce LDL cholesterol has been minimizing total body fat, in particular fat stored inside the abdominal cavity (visceral body fat). Visceral fat, which is more metabolically active than subcutaneous fat, has been found to produce many enzymatic signals, e.g. resistin, which increase insulin resistance and circulating VLDL particle concentrations, thus both increasing LDL particle concentrations and accelerating the development of diabetes mellitus.

See also

Notes and references

External links
 Fat (LDL) Degradation: PMAP The Proteolysis Map-animation
 Adult Treatment Panel III Full Report
 ATP III Update 2004
 

Cardiology
Lipid disorders
Lipoproteins